The 2012 Davis Cup (also known as the 2012 Davis Cup by BNP Paribas for sponsorship purposes) was the 101st edition of the tournament between national teams in men's tennis. The Czech Republic won the championship, beating Spain in the final, 3–2.

Czech Republic is the only country except United States and Australia to hold both Davis Cup and Fed Cup at the same time. The Czechs did the same in 2012, and they have also won the Hopman Cup.

The draw took place on 21 September 2011 in Bangkok, Thailand.

World Group

Seeds:

Draw

Final

World Group play-offs

Date: 14–16 September

The eight losing teams in the World Group first round ties and eight winners of the Zonal Group I final round ties will compete in the World Group play-offs for spots in the 2013 World Group.

Seeded teams
 
 
 
 
 
 
 
 

Unseeded teams

 
 
 
 
  
 
 
 

Americas Zone

Group I

Seeds:
 
 

Remaining Nations:

Draw

Group II

Seeds:
 
 
 
 

Remaining Nations:

Draw

Group III

 
 
 
  – promoted to Group II in 2013
  – promoted to Group II in 2013

Asia/Oceania Zone

Group I

Seeds:
 
 

Remaining Nations:

Draw

Group II

Seeds:
 
 
 
 

Remaining Nations:

Draw

Group III

  – relegated to Group IV in 2013
 
  – promoted to Group II in 2013
  – relegated to Group IV in 2013

 
 
  – promoted to Group II in 2013

Group IV

 
  – promoted to Group III in 2013
 
 
 

 
 
 
 
  – promoted to Group III in 2013

Europe/Africa Zone

Group I

Seeds:
 
 
 
 

Remaining Nations:

Draw

Group II

Seeds:
 
 
 
 
 
 
 
 

Remaining Nations:

Draw

Group III Europe

 
 
 
  – promoted to Group II in 2013
 
 

 
  – promoted to Group II in 2013

Group III Africa

 
  – promoted to Group II in 2013
 
 

 
 
  – promoted to Group II in 2013

References

External links
Official Site

 
Davis Cup
Davis Cups by year